Urologic chronic pelvic pain syndrome (UCPPS) is ongoing bladder pain in either sex, chronic prostatitis/chronic pelvic pain syndrome (CP/CPPS) in men and interstitial cystitis or painful bladder syndrome (IC/PBS) in women.

It was coined as an umbrella term for use in research into urologic pain syndromes in men and women.

Treatment
Multimodal therapy is the most successful treatment option in chronic pelvic pain, and includes physical therapy, myofascial trigger point release, relaxation techniques, α-blockers, and phytotherapy. The UPOINT diagnostic approach suggests that antibiotics are not recommended unless there is clear evidence of infection.

Research
In 2007, the National Institute of Diabetes and Digestive and Kidney Diseases (NIDDK), part of the United States National Institutes of Health (NIH), began using UCPPS as a term to refer to chronic pelvic pain syndromes (interstitial cystitis|interstitial cystitis/bladder pain syndrome (IC/BPS) in women and chronic prostatitis/chronic pelvic pain syndrome (CP/CPPS) in men).

MAPP Research Network
The NIDDK established the Multidisciplinary Approach to the Study of Chronic Pelvic Pain (MAPP) Research Network in 2008.

MAPP Network scientists use a whole–body, systemic approach to the study of UCPPS, as well as investigating potential relationships between UCPPS and other chronic conditions that are sometimes seen in IC/PBS and CP/CPPS patients, such as irritable bowel syndrome, fibromyalgia, and chronic fatigue syndrome.

References

Ailments of unknown cause
Urologic pelvic pain syndrome
Urinary bladder disorders
Chronic pain syndromes
Wikipedia medicine articles ready to translate